Ye Township (Mon: ပွိုၚ်ဍုၚ်ရေဝ်) is a township of Mawlamyine District in the Mon State, Myanmar. Its principal town is Ye.

Towns and villages

External links
 "Ye Township - Mon State" map, 4 August 2010, Myanmar Information Management Unit
Mawkanin

References

Townships of Mon State